Her Soul's Inspiration is a 1917 American silent drama film directed by Jack Conway and starring Ella Hall, Marc B. Robbins and Dick Ryan. Prints and/or fragments were found in the Dawson Film Find in 1978.

Synopsis 

The heroine Mary Weston (Ella Hall) seems to have been born with music in her feet. She is always dancing, and in virtue of a promise made to her dying mother, her father sells his farm and invests the proceeds in a traveling show, so that Mary may realize her ambition. However, her father dies and Mary was robbed of her inheritance by Madame Le Rue, a member of the company. Mary, who had her father's confidence, enters upon a career of vicissitudes and penury, in which two men, Silent Bob and Phillip Carstairs, help to shape her character, until the time arrives when the usurper is brought to book, and Mary comes into her own.

Cast
 Ella Hall as Mary Weston 
 Marc B. Robbins as Daddy Weston
 Dick Ryan as Philip Carstairs
 Edward Hearn as Silent Bob 
 Marcia Moore as Zella
 Margaret Whistler as Madame La Rue

References

Bibliography
 James Robert Parish & Michael R. Pitts. Film directors: a guide to their American films. Scarecrow Press, 1974.

External links
 

1917 films
1917 drama films
1910s English-language films
American silent feature films
Silent American drama films
Films directed by Jack Conway
American black-and-white films
Universal Pictures films
1910s American films